The Independent is a completed residential skyscraper in Austin, Texas.

The building was proposed in 2014, construction began in 2016, and was completed in spring 2019. It contains 58 floors, 370 condos, and it has been nicknamed the "Jenga Tower", and the "Tetris Tower". The 9th floor contains amenities such as a heated pool, club room, playground, and dog park, while the 34th floor contains a fitness center, yoga deck, and an outdoor lounge.

The design of the tower's crown has been criticized, to the extent of a protest group named Fix The Crown being created in March 2019.

See also
List of tallest buildings in Austin, Texas
List of tallest buildings in Texas
List of tallest buildings in the United States

References

External links
 

Buildings and structures in Austin, Texas
Residential skyscrapers in Austin, Texas
Residential condominiums in the United States